Lukáš Hroššo (born 19 April 1987) is a Slovak professional footballer who plays as a goalkeeper for Ekstraklasa club Cracovia.

Honours

Club
Slovan Liberec
 Czech Cup: 2014-15

Cracovia
 Polish Cup: 2019–20
 Polish Supercup: 2020

References

External links
FC Nitra profile 

1987 births
Living people
Slovak footballers
Association football goalkeepers
FC Nitra players
ŠK Slovan Bratislava players
FC Slovan Liberec players
FK Dukla Prague players
Zagłębie Sosnowiec players
MKS Cracovia (football) players
Expatriate footballers in the Czech Republic
Expatriate footballers in Poland
Slovak Super Liga players
Sportspeople from Nitra
Czech First League players
Ekstraklasa players
III liga players
Slovak expatriate sportspeople in the Czech Republic
Slovak expatriate sportspeople in Poland
Slovak expatriate footballers